This is a list of members of the House of Commons of Canada in the 42nd Canadian Parliament.

Members
Party leaders are italicized.
Cabinet ministers are in boldface.
The Prime Minister is both.
The Speaker is (†).

Alberta

 Resigned from caucus on August 31, 2017.
 Conservative leader until May 27, 2017.

British Columbia

 Expelled from caucus on April 2, 2019.

Manitoba

New Brunswick

Newfoundland and Labrador

Nova Scotia

Ontario

 Changed affiliation on September 17, 2018.
 Resigned from caucus November 30, 2018.
 Expelled from caucus on April 2, 2019.
 Resigned from caucus November 7, 2018.
 Resigned from caucus March 20, 2019.

Prince Edward Island

Quebec

 Resigned from caucus August 23, 2018. Changed affiliation on September 14, 2018.
 Resigned from caucus February 28, 2017.
 Changed affiliation on September 17, 2018.
 Expelled from New Democratic caucus August 16, 2019; joined Green caucus on August 19, 2019.
 Changed affiliation on June 6, 2018.
 New Democratic leader until October 1, 2017.
 Bloc Québécois leader until March 18, 2017.

Saskatchewan

 Expelled from New Democratic caucus May 3, 2018; declared himself a member of the CCF on May 11, 2018.
 Conservative leader since May 27, 2017.

The Northern Territories

 Resigned from caucus May 31, 2016.

Changes since the 42nd election
The party standings have changed as follows:

Membership changes

Standings
The party standings in the House of Commons have changed as follows:

Notes

References 

Members
42